Aliidiomarina sanyensis is a Gram-negative, aerobic, non-spore-forming, hexabromocyclododecane-assimilating, rod-shaped and motile bacterium from the genus of Aliidiomarina which has been isolated from a pool of Spirulina plantensis from Sanya in China.

References

Bacteria described in 2017
Alteromonadales